Iulian Carabela (born 11 April 1996) is a Romanian professional footballer who plays as a left back for Axiopolis Cernavodă. In his career, also played for teams such as Axiopolis Cernavodă, Juventus București or Farul Constanța, among others.

References

External links
 
 

1996 births
Living people
Romanian footballers
Association football defenders
Liga I players
Liga II players
Liga III players
FC Delta Dobrogea Tulcea players
ASC Daco-Getica București players
ACS Poli Timișoara players
CS Aerostar Bacău players
FCV Farul Constanța players
FC Unirea Constanța players